San Marino selected their Junior Eurovision Song Contest 2014 entry through an internal selection. On 26 September 2014 it was revealed that The Peppermints would represent San Marino in the contest with the song "Breaking My Heart".

Internal selection
On 26 September 2014, it was revealed that the Italian/Sammarinese girl band The Peppermints, would represent San Marino with song named "Breaking My Heart".

At Junior Eurovision 
At the running order draw which took place on 9 November 2014, San Marino were drawn to perform third on 15 November 2014, following  and preceding .

Voting

Detailed voting results
The Sammarinese votes in this final were based on 100% jury. The following members comprised the Sammarinese jury:
 Fausto Giacomini
 Lorena Chiarelli
 Monica Moroni
 Andrea Gattei
 Alessia Mangano

Notes

References

Junior Eurovision Song Contest
San Marino
Junior